Price Medal is a medal of the Royal Astronomical Society, for investigations of outstanding merit in solid-earth geophysics, oceanography, or planetary sciences. The medal is named after Albert Thomas Price. It was first awarded in 1994 and was initially given every three years. In 2005 this switched to every two years, and from 2014 it has been awarded every year.

Price Medallists 
Source: Royal Astronomical Society (unless otherwise noted)
 
 1994 
 1997 Catherine Constable
 2000 Jean-Louis Le Mouël
 2003 Y. Kaminde
 2005 Gillian Foulger
 2007 Andrew Jackson
 2009 Malcolm Sambridge
 2011 Roger Searle
 2013 Kathryn Whaler
 2014 Seth Stein
 2015 John Brodholt
 2016 John Tarduno
 2017 Richard Holme
 2018 Stuart Crampin
 2019 Catherine Johnson
 2020 Phil Livermore
 2021 Emily Brodsky
 2022 Hrvoje Tkalcic
 2023 Rhian Jones

See also

 List of astronomy awards
 List of geophysicists
 List of geophysics awards
 List of prizes named after people

References

Astronomy prizes
British science and technology awards
Awards established in 1994
Astronomy in the United Kingdom
Royal Astronomical Society
1994 establishments in the United Kingdom
Geophysics awards